The Motor Press Guild (abbreviated MPG) is the largest professional automotive media association in North America. This Los Angeles-based non-profit association is made up of professionals in motoring journalism and news media. Their goal is to promote education and information exchange within the motoring press.

Information
Members include staff and freelance journalists, photographers, broadcasters, and similar media professionals, as well as public-relations representatives from vehicle manufacturers, industry suppliers, aftermarket companies, consumer groups, governmental bodies and other motoring-related firms and organizations. There are currently around 750 members who work throughout many regions of the United States.

MPG is the bestower of the Dean Batchelor Award, an annual award which recognizes excellence in automotive journalism. The MPG is also the publisher of the MPG Membership Roster & Media Guide, a widely used annually published book which contains a comprehensive list of key industry contacts.

References

Automotive industry in the United States
Communications and media organizations based in the United States